The research project OSAMI-D is the German subproject of the European ITEA 2 project OSAMI (Open Source AMbient Intelligence).

The aim of the international project OSAMI is the design of a basic, widely applicable SOA-oriented component platform, its development, test and its provision as open source software. The project consists of a number of national subprojects, each focussing on a certain field of application. The German subproject OSAMI-D, funded by the BMBF, the German ministry of education and research, under reference number 01 IS 08003, contributes to the e-Health domain. The main objectives are interoperability, maintainability, reliability, as well as automated configuration and management of medical devices and services to provide new forms of healthcare to diseased and convalescent people. The advantages of these technical contributions will be demonstrated by means of an e-Health application which supports ambulant cardiologic rehabilitation.
The software component platform specified by the OSGi Alliance forms the technical basis of the OSAMI platform. It provides lifecycle management for software components as well as local service interactions as defined in service-oriented architectures and will be combined with the Web Services approach, in particular DPWS / WS4D in order to implement distributed, dynamically configurable, vendor-neutral and device-independent solutions.
Project data
Support programme: BMBF IKT2020
Duration: 01.07.2008 - 31.12.2011

General information
The main objective of OSAMI is to connect technologically vertical markets on the basis of open source components and, hence, to facilitate the market entry for small and medium-sized enterprises (SME).

Technical and Scientific Objectives of OSAMI-D
 Establishment of the interoperability of medical devices' ensemble
 Establishment of the interoperability of medical devices and services for the integrated healthcare in service-oriented environments
 Policy based configuration and management of adaptive OSAMI-based service systems
 Infrastructure for intelligent management and service concepts in OSAMI-based systems

Participants
Corscience GmbH & Co. KG, Erlangen
MATERNA GmbH Information & Communications, Dortmund
OFFIS - Institute for Information Technology, Oldenburg
ProSyst Software GmbH, Cologne
Schüchtermann-Schiller’sche Kliniken Bad Rothenfelde GmbH & Co. KG, Bad Rothenfelde
C-Lab Atos (ex SIEMENS AG), Paderborn
TU Dortmund, AG RvS, Dortmund
Universität Paderborn, Paderborn
Universität Rostock, Rostock

Work Packages and Tasks
WP 1: Coordination and Dissemination
WP 2: Business, Trust and Processes (without participation of German subproject)
WP 3: Organisation, Tools and Training (without participation of German subproject)
WP 4: Vertical Domains - Analysis and DesignThe aim of WP 4 of the German subproject is the requirements analysis particularly for the use of the OSAMI-based services and systems in the application domain "IT in Healthcare" and design of the domain specific components for the OSAMI architecture. The intra-domain "horizontal" architecture design and the actual software implementation take place in WP 5.
WP 5: OSAMI Interface & ArchitectureWP 5 concentrates on defining the intra-domain OSAMI architecture considering SOA-principles for distributed, device-based systems and their realization under the Open Source licence model. The architecture is the basis of the implementation of components for the healthcare domain specified in WP 4. Complementary proprietary components and the policy-based management system are produced (ref. e.g. WS-Policy).
WP 6: Security, Assets and User interface issuesData security, easy integration and management of the external components as well as multimodal and plainly defined user interfaces are important for the acceptance and wide applicability of OSAMI applications. These features set the stage for processing sensitive data and reduce the barriers for deployment.The German subproject focuses on the data security for e-Health applications. These applications handle with sensitive, personal data and thus must be reliable. Therefore, there are distinct data security requirements, which are to be considered representatively for the requirements for the more sophisticated general applications.
WP 7: Demonstrators In WP 7 the components of the e-Health demonstrator on the basis of the OSAMI architecture and the results of WPs 4 - 6 are to be integrated. The integrated hard- and software components are to be well tried and proven in a realistic scenario. The evaluation covers the acceptance of the new technologies by end users in addition to the technical requirements.The development and the validation of the demonstrator occur in three successive phases. The first phase is intended for the implementation of a so-called "mock-up" with an initial design of the user interface and primary implementation of the corresponding hardware and software components. These form among others the basis for the following phases of the overall project's work plan.

External links
OSAMI
ITEA 2
EUREKA
BMBF IKT2020
Web Services for Devices (Open Source Software)

Information technology organisations based in Germany